This is a list of television broadcasters which provide coverage of the Premier League, English football's top-level competition, which is the most watched league in the world. The main broadcasters in the United Kingdom and Ireland, in current contract (2019-22), are Sky Sports (128 of the 200 televised games in the UK and Ireland), BT Sport (52), and Amazon Prime Video (20) (UK version) / Premier Sports (20) (Ireland only). The BBC shows weekly highlights of the Premier League on its Match of the Day and Match of the Day 2 programmes on Saturdays and Sundays.

The 200 UK televised games are also broadcast across the world; the remaining 180 matches that aren't broadcast live in the UK are all broadcast elsewhere around the world outside Europe (in Europe, 233 matches are broadcast). English-speaking countries (excluding the UK) are able to carry what is known as the 'International feed' or 'World feed' audio; this is full match commentary provided by the Premier League. In Asia, and select other countries around the world, there is also a fully produced studio broadcast called Premier League Productions where pre, half time and post-match analysis is offered. This is currently hosted by Steve Bower and Manish Bhasin.

The 3:00pm (UK time) Saturday kick-offs are not allowed to be shown live in the UK due to the hours of 2:45pm to 5:15pm being 'blocked broadcasting hours', as requested by the FA and enforced by UEFA. In Ireland, a different situation applies; a package of only one Saturday 3:00pm kick off each week (along with one game on the final Sunday) is sold as an addition to the UK live rights packages, this package is currently held by Premier Sports. While there is no rule prohibiting the screening of the other 3:00pm games in Ireland, the Premier League does not make the rights to these games available to Irish broadcasters, due to the overlap in reception that is possible in Northern Ireland and mainland Great Britain.

Broadcasters 

Notes

Overseas broadcasters

References

External links
 Premier League official website

 
Broadcasters
Association football on television
English Premier League